Qiongzhou or Qiong Prefecture was a zhou (prefecture) in imperial China in modern northeastern Hainan, China. It existed from 631 to 1329, but between 742 and 758 it was known as Qiongshan Commandery (also translated as Qiongshan Prefecture).

Counties
In the Tang dynasty, Qiong Prefecture administered the following counties:
Qiongshan, roughly modern Haikou
Lingao, roughly modern Lingao County
Lehui, roughly modern Qionghai
Zengkou, roughly modern Chengmai County
Yanluo, roughly modern southern Haikou or Ding'an County

Yanluo was abolished late in the Tang dynasty, while Zengkou was abolished by Southern Han. In the Song dynasty, Qiong Prefecture again administered 5 counties, including:
Qiongshan
Lingao
Lehui
Chengmai, roughly modern Chengmai County
Wenchang, roughly modern Wenchang

References

 
 
 

Prefectures of the Tang dynasty
Guangnan West Circuit
Prefectures of Southern Han
Former prefectures in Hainan
Prefectures of the Yuan dynasty
631 establishments
7th-century establishments in China
1329 disestablishments in Asia
14th-century disestablishments in China